Gulla is a surname. Notable people with the surname include:

Alejandra Gulla (born 1977), Argentine field hockey player
Bob Gulla, American music historian and musicologist, music encyclopedia author, and biographer and writer
Joe Gulla (born 1964), American playwright, actor and reality television participant